The Ambassador Extraordinary and Plenipotentiary of the Russian Federation to the Republic of Azerbaijan is the official representative of the President and the Government of the Russian Federation to the President and the Government of Azerbaijan.

The ambassador and his staff work at large in the Embassy of Russia in Baku.

List of representatives (1992 – present)

References

 
Azerbaijan
Russia